Pozzi is an Italian surname. Notable people with the surname include:

Alessandro Pozzi (born 1969), Italian former professional racing cyclist
Andrea Pozzi (1778–1833), Italian painter of religious and mythologic histories
Andrew Pozzi (born 1992), British athlete
Angela Haseltine Pozzi (born 1957), American sculptor
Antonia Pozzi (1912–1938), Italian poet
Baby Pozzi (born 1963) - stage name of Maria Pozzi, Italian former pornographic film actress
Carlo Ignazio Pozzi (1786–1842), painter and architect born at Mannheim, Germany
Charles Pozzi (1909–2001), French racing driver
Domenico Pozzi (1742–1796), painter of Swiss origin
Elisabetta Pozzi (born 1955), Italian actress
Francesco Pozzi (1742–1805), Italian engraver
Gianluca Pozzi (born 1965), former tennis player from Italy
Giovanni Battista Pozzi, Italian painter, born in Milan towards the end of the 17th century
Henri Pozzi (1879–1946), French politician, diplomat and author
Lucio Pozzi (born 1935), American artist born in Milan, Italy
Maurizio Pozzi (born 1970), Italian cross country skier
Moana Pozzi (1961–1994), Italian pornographic actress
Nicola Pozzi (born 1986), Italian footballer
Oscar Pozzi (born 1971), Italian former racing cyclist
Piero Pozzi (born 1920), retired Italian professional football player
Pozzi Escot (born 1933), American composer
Rocco Pozzi, Italian painter and engraver of the Baroque period
Samuel Jean de Pozzi (1846–1918), French surgeon and gynecologist
Stefano Pozzi (1699–1768), Italian painter, designer, draughtsman and decorator
Tancredi Pozzi (1864- 1924), Italian sculptor

See also 

 Pozzo (surname)
 Pozzi (disambiguation)

Italian-language surnames